Dafne Schippers (born 15 June 1992) is a Dutch track and field athlete. She competes primarily in the sprints, having previously participated in the heptathlon. She is the 2015 and 2017 World champion and won silver at the 2016 Rio Olympics in the 200 metres.

Schippers is the European record holder for the 200 m with a time of 21.63 seconds and is the sixth-fastest woman of all time at this distance. She also holds the Dutch record for the 100 m and long jump, and is co-record holder for the 60 m. She won more than 20 national titles.

Early life
Dafne Schippers was born on 15 June 1992 in Utrecht, the Netherlands. She started competing in athletics at the age of nine at the track and field club Hellas in Utrecht.

Early career

Schippers originally competed in the heptathlon and won gold medals at the 2010 World Junior Championships in Athletics and 2011 European Athletics Junior Championships. At the 2010 World Junior Championships she also won a bronze in the 4 × 100 metres relay with her team mates Loreanne Kuhurima, Eva Lubbers and Jamile Samuel.

In 2011 at the World Championships in Daegu, South Korea, Schippers broke the Dutch national record in the 200 m in the heats in 22.69, before finishing ninth in the semifinals, missing the final by 0.04 seconds. The 4 × 100 metres relay team (Kadene Vassell, Schippers, Anouk Hagen and Samuel) were eliminated in the heats in a national record of 43.44 seconds.

In 2012, Schippers was invited to participate at the prestigious heptathlon Hypo-Meeting in Götzis, Austria, where she finished fith. She also competed at the 2012 European Athletics Championships in Helsinki, Finland, finishing fifth at the 200 metres. The race was disappointing after she had won her heat in 23.01 s and recorded the fastest semi-final time of 22.70 s. The Dutch 4 x 100 m relay team (Kadene Vassell, Schippers, Eva Lubbers and Samuel) were second in 42.80 s, a national record, behind the German team.

A year later, she started with a third place at the Hypo-Meeting, with 6287 points. Next, she won gold in the 100 m and bronze in the long jump at the 2013 European Athletics U23 Championships. At the subsequent 2013 World Championships in Moscow, Schippers won the bronze medal in the heptathlon, collapsing over the line after taking a massive seven seconds off her personal best in the 800 metres to see off Briton Katarina Johnson-Thompson and Germany's Claudia Rath for the bronze. She became the first Dutch woman to win a medal in the heptathlon at the World Athletics Championships.

Schippers improved the 200 m record during the heptathlon at the 2014 Hypo-Meeting in Götzis, her time of 22.35 s being one of the best 200 m performances ever in a heptathlon. She finished third at the hepthatlon with 6545 points, a new national record. At the European championships of 2014, Schippers won gold medals in the 100 m and the 200 m. The 4 x 100 m relay team, one of the favourites for the title, did not finish in the final due to a botched first baton change.

Shifting to sprinting
Her success at the 2014 European Athletics Championships prompted discussion over her long-term prospects and whether she should focus on sprinting, or continue her career in the heptathlon. In June 2015, Schippers announced via Twitter that she would focus on sprinting in the run-up to the 2015 World Championships in Athletics in Beijing, China and the 2016 Summer Olympics in Rio de Janeiro (Brazil).

The 2015 season had started well with a win in the 60 m at the 2015 European Athletics Indoor Championships in Prague, Czechia. At the 2015 Beijing World Championships, Schippers won the silver medal in the 100 m and gold in the 200 m, just before Elaine Thompson. Her 200 m winning time of 21.63 seconds was a new European record and made her the third fastest woman in history over that distance. The Dutch 4 × 100 m relay team (Nadine Visser, Schippers, Naomi Sedney and Samuel) finished fifth in 42.32 s, but was disqualified for a changeover infringement. In the heats the team had also run 42.32 s, a new national record. Her stunning victory opened her up to scrutiny about possible doping. There were questions about the acne on Schippers back and face, which can be a sign of steroid abuse. Most insiders, however, dismissed those claims, pointing out that the acne was hereditary in the family and the fast track in Beijing.

Next year, she won the 100 m at the 2016 European Athletics Championships in Amsterdam with time of 10.90 s, by 3 tenths of a second. The Dutch team led by Schippers, with Samuel, Tessa van Schagen and anchor runner Naomi Sedney won the 4 x 100 m relay with a national record of 42.04 s.

At the 2016 Rio Olympics expectation was high that she would add an Olympic title to the gold medal at the 2015 World Championships, following in the footsteps of Fanny Blankers-Koen who had dominated the sprint events at the 1948 Summer Olympic Games, winning four golds. However, she finished fifth in the 100 m final and won the silver medal in the 200 m behind Elaine Thompson, who became the first woman for 28 years to complete the Olympic sprint double. After defeat in the 200 m, Schippers remained forlorn on the side of the track for a while, took off her spikes and hurled them to one side in frustration. "I came here for gold", she told reporters, disappointment showing in her face. "I'm not happy with the silver." The Dutch relay team was eliminated in the heats due to a botched relay handover between Samuel and Schippers.

Change of coaches

After the disappointment of Rio, Schippers decided to change. She parted with Bart Bennema as her coach, who had overseen her transition from an outstanding heptathlete, winning bronze in the World Championships Moscow 2013, into a successful 100 m and 200 m sprinter. Both felt that she had to try a different approach to progress, and so she decided to join U.S. coach and sprint guru Rana Reider and focus on the 2017 World Championships in Athletics in London, to defend her world title in the 200 m. After winning the bronze in the 100 m, she won the 200 m title, joining Jamaican Merlene Ottey and USA’s Allyson Felix as the only athletes to successfully defend a world title in the event. “It’s a great feeling to be world champion for the second time,” she said. “I was a bit nervous beforehand, but I’m a final runner, and bring my best in finals, so I’m very grateful for the experience today. There were so many Dutch fans in the stadium, all wearing orange. To win this two times in a row is brilliant." The Dutch 4 × 100 m relay team (Madiea Ghafoor, Schippers, Sedney, Samuel) finished 8th.

For the 2018 season, the focus for the "Flying Dutchwoman of the sprints" was on the 2018 European Athletics Championships at the Olympiastadion in Berlin. However, it was British sprinter Dina Asher-Smith who became the star of the sprint there, winning gold on both the 100 m and 200 m, as well as the 4 x 100 m relay. Schippers won a bronze in the 100 m and a silver in the 200 m. The 4 x 100 m relay team with Schippers, Marije van Hunenstijn, Samuel and Sedney also finished second.

Due to the disappointing results, the collaboration between Schippers and Reider came under scrutiny. Although Reider did prepare her for her special second world title at 200 m and bronze at 100 m at the 2017 World Championships, many other races looked rigid and she had lost her most important weapon, the 'acceleration' in the end. Due to increased power training she became more muscular, but on the track this did not lead to improvements. She could not improve her 2015 top chrono's. Reider suddenly left the National Sports Centre Papendal in the Netherlands in November 2018, and Schippers returned to her first coach, Bart Bennema.

Nevertheless, the 2019 season was not successful. She did win a silver in the 60 m at the European Indoor Championships. But at the 2019 World Championships in Doha, Schippers had to withdraw before the final of the 100 m with an adductor problem. She subsequently withdrew from the 200 m and the 4 x 100 m relay.

Trivia
The Dafne Schippersbrug (Dafne Schippers Bridge) in Utrecht, where Schippers grew up, was opened in April 2017, and named in her honour.

Achivements

All information from World Athletics profile.

International competitions

1Did not finish in the final
2Did not start in the final

Personal bests
 60 metres indoor – 7.00 (Berlin 2016) =
 60 metres hurdles indoor – 8.18 (Apeldoorn 2012)
 100 metres – 10.81 (-0.3) (Beijing 2015) 
 150 metres – 16.93 (+2.0) (Amsterdam 2013)
 200 metres – 21.63 (+0.2) (Beijing 2015) European record, 6th athlete all time
 100 metres hurdles – 13.13 (-1.2 m/s, Götzis 2014)
 High jump – 1.80 m (London 2012)
 [High jump indoor - 1.74 m (Dortmund 2009)
 Long jump – 6.78 m (+0.0 m/s, Amsterdam 2014) 
 Long jump indoor – 6.48 m (Apeldoorn 2015)
 Shot put – 14.66 m (Götzis 2015)
 Shot put indoor – 13.91 m (Apeldoorn 2012)
 Javelin throw – 42.82 m (Hoorn 2014)
 Heptathlon – 6545 pts (Götzis 2014) ex-
 4 × 100 metres relay – 42.04 (Amsterdam 2016)

Circuit win and titles
 Diamond League Overall 200m Diamond Race Title: 2016
 2014 (2): Lausanne Athletissima (4×100m relay), Glasgow Grand Prix (200m)
 2015 (2): London Anniversary Games (100m, NR), Brussels Memorial Van Damme (200m)
 2016 (4): Oslo Bislett Games (200m), Monaco Herculis (100m), London (200m), Paris Meeting (200m)
 2017 (3): Rome Golden Gala (100m), Oslo (200m), Lausanne (200m)
 2019 (3): Oslo (200m, SB), Lausanne (4×100m relay)
 2021 (1): Gateshead Grand Prix (4×100m relay)

National titles
 Dutch Athletics Championships
 100 metres: 2011, 2012, 2014, 2015, 2019, 2021, 2022
 Long jump: 2012, 2014
 Dutch Indoor Athletics Championships
 60 metres: 2010, 2011, 2012, 2013, 2014, 2015, 2016, 2018, 2019
 Long jump: 2011, 2013, 2014, 2015

References

External links

 
 
 
 
 Dafne Schippers at Koninklijke Nederlandse Atletiek Unie 
 
 
 

1992 births
Athletes (track and field) at the 2012 Summer Olympics
Athletes (track and field) at the 2016 Summer Olympics
Dutch female sprinters
Dutch heptathletes
European Athletics Championships medalists
Living people
Medalists at the 2016 Summer Olympics
Olympic athletes of the Netherlands
Olympic silver medalists for the Netherlands
Olympic silver medalists in athletics (track and field)
Sportspeople from Utrecht (city)
World Athletics Championships athletes for the Netherlands
World Athletics Championships medalists
World Athletics Indoor Championships medalists
European Athlete of the Year winners
World Athletics Championships winners
Diamond League winners
IAAF Continental Cup winners
Dutch Athletics Championships winners
Athletes (track and field) at the 2020 Summer Olympics
Olympic female sprinters
20th-century Dutch women
20th-century Dutch people
21st-century Dutch women